Echis megalocephalus, also known commonly as the big-headed carpet viper and Cherlin's saw-scaled viper, is a species of venomous snake in the family Viperidae. The species is endemic to one island in the Red Sea off the coast of Eritrea. There are no subspecies that are recognized as being valid.

Description
The head is similar to that of E. pyramidum. Midbody, there are 31 rows of dorsal scales. The ventrals number 186–202, and the subcaudals 33–37. The color pattern varies, but generally consists of a series of pale, oblique, dorsal blotches set against a darker ground color.

Geographic range
E. megalocephalus is known only from the type locality, Nokra (Nocra) Island, which is part of the Dahlak Archipelago, off the coast of Eritrea in the Red Sea.

Reproduction
E. megalocephalus is oviparous.

References

Further reading

 Cherlin VA (1990). "[A taxonomic revision of the snake genus Echis (Viperidae). II. An analysis of taxonomy and description of new forms]". [Proceedings of the Zoological Institute of Leningrad] 207: 193-223. (Echis megalocephalus, new species). (in Russian).
 Golay P, Smith HM, Broadley DG, Dixon JR, McCarthy CJ, Rage J-C, Schätti B, Toriba M (1993). Endoglyphs and Other Major Venomous Snakes of the World. A Checklist. Geneva: Azemiops Herpetological Data Center. 478 pp.

External links
 

Viperinae
Endemic fauna of Eritrea
Vertebrates of Eritrea
Snakes of Africa
Reptiles described in 1990